Darius Butkus (born November 11, 1972) is a Lithuanian former international footballer who played for FK Ekranas and FK Nevėžis, as a defender.

International career
Butkus played two matches for Lithuania at the 1993 Baltic Cup. He had previously played against Finland and Latvia at an indoor Baltic Cup in February 1993. The Lithuanian Football Federation did not consider the matches to be official international games, but Lithuania's opponents and world governing body FIFA did.

International statistics

References

External links
 Futbolinis.lt 
 
 

1972 births
Living people
Lithuanian footballers
Lithuania international footballers
FK Ekranas players
Lithuanian football managers
Sportspeople from Kretinga
Association football defenders